Old Mystic is a village and census-designated place (CDP) located in the town of Groton, Connecticut.  The population was 3,554 at the 2010 census.

Geography

Demographics
As of the census of 2000, there were 3,205 people, 1,205 households, and 880 families residing in the CDP. The racial makeup of the CDP was 90.11% White, 2.43% African American, 0.66% American Indian, 3.43% Asian, 0.06% Pacific Islander, 0.50% from other races, and 2.81% from two or more races. Hispanic or Latino of any race were 1.62% of the population.

There were 1,205 households, out of which 34.6% had children under the age of 18 living with them, 60.0% were married couples living together, 9.4% had a female householder with no husband present, and 26.9% were non-families. 19.5% of all households were made up of individuals, and 5.1% had someone living alone who was 65 years of age or older.  The average household size was 2.64 and the average family size was 3.06.

In the CDP, the population was spread out, with 25.7% under the age of 18, 5.5% from 18 to 24, 32.7% from 25 to 44, 25.3% from 45 to 64, and 10.7% who were 65 years of age or older.  The median age was 38 years. For every 100 females, there were 96.1 males.  For every 100 females age 18 and over, there were 97.2 males.

The median income for a household in the CDP was $63,036, and the median income for a family was $68,500. Males had a median income of $50,095 versus $31,536 for females. The per capita income for the CDP was $27,988.  About 1.5% of families and 3.2% of the population were below the poverty line, including 1.6% of those under age 18 and 3.8% of those age 65 or over.

References

Groton, Connecticut
Census-designated places in New London County, Connecticut
Villages in Connecticut